William Tyler may refer to:

William Seymour Tyler (1810–1897), historian
William Tyler (rugby), rugby player active c. 1907–08
William R. Tyler (1910–2003), American diplomat
William Tyler (musician) (born 1979), American musician
William Tyler (bishop) (1806–1849), American Roman Catholic bishop of Hartford
William Tyler (architect) (1728–1801), English sculptor, landscaper, and architect, and a founding member of the Royal Academy
William Tyler (footballer), English footballer
Steel Arm Tyler (William Tyler, 1905–1970), American Negro leagues baseball player

See also
William Tiler, MP for Leominster, 1406–1410